Kavi Gupta is a contemporary art gallery owned by gallerist Kavi Gupta. Headquartered in the West Loop neighborhood of Chicago, the gallery operates multiple exhibition spaces as well as Kavi Gupta Editions, a publishing imprint and bookstore.

Kavi Gupta opened in Chicago in 2000. The gallery expanded to a second space in the Tempelhof-Schöneberg borough of Berlin in 2008. In September 2013 the gallery expanded to a third space in Chicago. The new space opened with an installation exhibition by Roxy Paine titled Apparatus.

Artists currently represented by Kavi Gupta include MacArthur Genius Grant recipient Jeffrey Gibson, who was in the 2019 Whitney Biennial in New York; Anonymous Was a Woman Award recipient Beverly Fishman; AFRICOBRA co-founders Gerald Williams, Jae Jarrell and Wadsworth Jarrell, who were featured in the exhibition Nation Time at the 2019 Venice Biennale; Guggenheim Fellow Tony Tasset, who was in the 2014 Whitney Biennial; sculptor Richard Hunt; Roxy Paine, who was part of the 2002 Whitney Biennial in New York, Painter Clare Rojas, who was featured in the documentary, Beautiful Losers, the estate of Chicago Imagist painter Roger Brown, Glenn Kaino, José Lerma, Jessica Stockholder, James Little, and Mickalene Thomas.

Kavi Gupta is active at art fairs around the world, including Art Basel in Miami Beach and in Hong Kong, The Armory Show in New York, EXPO Chicago, Art Chicago, Frieze Art Fair in New York and London, Frieze Masters, and Felix LA.

Publishing
In 2014, Kavi Gupta opened Kavi Gupta Editions, an art bookstore and publishing imprint. Its publications include books about artists Alfred Conteh, Clare Rojas, Glenn Kaino, José Lerma, and Jessica Stockholder.

References

External links
official website

Contemporary art galleries in the United States
Art galleries established in 2000
American art dealers
Art museums and galleries in Chicago
2000 establishments in Illinois